Rockpalast Live is a DVD of Harry Chapin performing on German music television show Rockpalast on April 12, 1977.

Track listing
 "Shooting Star"
 "W*O*L*D"
 "Mr. Tanner"
 "Dance Band on the Titanic"
 "Taxi"
 "Six-String Orchestra"
 "Corey's Coming"
 "Blues Man"
 "Mail Order Annie"
 "30,000 Pounds of Bananas"
 "Cat's in the Cradle"
 "Circle"
 "Odd Job Man"
 "I Wanna Learn a Love Song"

Harry Chapin video albums
2002 video albums
Live video albums
2002 live albums